Mateusz Skrzypczak (born 22 August 2000) is a Polish professional footballer who plays as a centre-back or a defensive midfielder for Jagiellonia Białystok.

Club career

Skrzypczak started his career with Lech Poznań.

On 4 August 2020, he joined Puszcza Niepołomice on a season-long loan.

On 23 May 2022, Skrzypczak signed a two-year contract with another Ekstraklasa side Jagiellonia Białystok.

Career statistics

1 Including Polish Super Cup.

Honours
Lech Poznań
 Ekstraklasa: 2021–22

References

External links

 

2000 births
Footballers from Poznań
Living people
Polish footballers
Poland youth international footballers
Association football midfielders
Lech Poznań II players
Lech Poznań players
Puszcza Niepołomice players
OKS Stomil Olsztyn players
Jagiellonia Białystok players
Ekstraklasa players
I liga players
II liga players
III liga players